A working dog is a dog used to perform practical tasks, as opposed to pet or companion dogs.

Definitions vary on what a working dog is, they are sometimes described as any dog trained for and employed in meaningful work; other times as any dog whose breed heritage or physical characteristics lend itself to working irrespective of an individual animal's training or employment; and other times again it is used as a synonym for herding dog.

Working dog types 

Roles performed by dogs that sometimes sees them classified as working dogs include:
 Assistance dog trained to help a disabled person in some way, such as guiding a visually impaired person, opening doors or alerting to a ringing phone.
 Carriage dog historically used to provide protection to carriage passengers or merchandise 
 Detection dog or sniffer dog, trained to detect for example drugs or land mines. 
 Drafting dog traditionally used to pull dog carts
 Guard dog used to protect buildings or livestock
 Guide dog
 Herding dog
 Military working dog trained in combat, or used scouts, sentries, messengers, mercy dogs, and trackers
 Search and rescue dog
 Service dog
 Sled dog
 Therapy dog used to provide companionship or to help people rehabilitate from injuries

Working dogs in Australia
Working dogs are known as an Australian icon. They are prevalent in Australia due to the large agricultural industry. Working dogs can be seen herding cattle or sheep and are also used to guard poultry from foxes and cats. A report in 2019 stated that there were over 270,000 stock herding dogs in Australia. Some popular breeds for farm work include Border Collies, Kelpies, Maremmas and Australian Cattle Dogs.

Events to showcase the skills of working dogs are held through Australia alongside key local festivals and events. Trials and performances include high jumps, sheepdog speed trials and sled or weighted pulls.

Kennel club classification
When competing in conformation shows, a number of kennel clubs classify various pedigree dog breeds into a "working group" or "working dogs group", although it varies between kennel club what breeds are so classified. The Kennel Club classifies mastiff, pinscher, sled dog, select livestock guardian dog and some other breeds in their working group. The American Kennel Club's working group and the Canadian Kennel Club's working dogs group are very similar to The Kennel Club's except they include all livestock guardian dog breeds and all full sized spitz breeds (not just sled dogs) recognised by the clubs. Both the Australian National Kennel Council's and New Zealand Kennel Club's working dogs groups comprise herding dog breeds and select livestock guardian dog breeds recognised by those clubs. The Fédération cynologique internationale has no working group.

See also

References